Joshua Max Brener is an American actor. He played the roles of Kyle on the IFC series Maron and Nelson "Big Head" Bighetti on the HBO series Silicon Valley. In animation, he provides the voices of Donatello on Rise of the Teenage Mutant Ninja Turtles, Neeku Vozo on Star Wars Resistance and Dylan Dalmatian on 101 Dalmatian Street.

Early life
Brener was raised in a Jewish household. He attended Bellaire High School.

He graduated from Harvard University in 2007. He was the president of the Hasty Pudding Theatricals.

Filmography

Film

Television

Video games

Music videos

References

External links

 

Living people
Male actors from Houston
American male television actors
American male film actors
American male voice actors
Jewish American male actors
Hasty Pudding alumni
21st-century American Jews
1984 births